Playful Kiss ((also known as Mischievous Kiss or Naughty Kiss) is a 2010 South Korean romantic-comedy television series, starring Jung So-min and Kim Hyun-joong. It aired on MBC from September 1 to October 21, 2010 on Wednesdays and Thursdays at 21:55 for 16 episodes.

It is based on the Japanese manga Itazura Na Kiss written by Tada Kaoru. The Korean series is the third television adaptation of the manga following the Taiwanese It Started with a Kiss in 2005, and its sequel They Kiss Again in 2007. Due to its international popularity, a short special edition was aired on YouTube after the series finale.

Plot 
A ditsy and unpopular Oh Ha-Ni (Jung So-Min) is in love with her opposite, Baek Seung-Jo (Kim Hyun-Joong) who is a smart and popular boy and never accepts her feelings. Tension rises when Oh Ha-Ni and her dad have to live in the same home as Baek Seung-Jo and his parents due to unexpected reasons

Cast

Main characters

 Kim Hyun-joong as Baek Seung-jo
 Baek Seung-jo is the smartest and the most handsome guy in the high school. He is rumored to have an IQ of 200, but has a cold attitude. Ha-ni writes him a love letter which he rejects, claiming he hates stupid girls. When Ha-ni and her father move in with his family, he still continues his cold attitude towards her, but warms up to her over time and slowly falls for her. Eventually, he proposes to Ha-ni and decides to be a doctor instead of inheriting his father's gaming company.
 Jung So-min as Oh Ha-ni
 Oh Ha-ni is a not so bright girl who struggles academically and is at the bottom of her class. She has had a crush on Baek Seung-jo, the smartest and most handsome boy in the whole school, for three years. One day, Ha-ni decides to write a love letter for Seung-jo but Seung-jo rejects her publicly, correcting the grammar in her letter. Fate happens when an earthquake strikes Ha-ni's newly built home and they are invited to stay with her father's childhood friend, who happens to be Seung-jo's father. Seung-jo is cold to her at first, but he eventually falls for her and their relationship develops. She later marries Seung-jo and decides to become a nurse.
 Lee Tae-sung as Bong Joon-gu 
 Bong Joon-gu has been in love with Oh Ha-ni since his first year of High School. He loves her so much that he follows her everywhere and encourages her, hoping that she will feel the same way. He is devastated when he finds out Ha-ni is dating Seung-jo, but does not give up on her until he finds out that she is marrying Seung-jo. However, he later meets a girl named Chris who has a crush on him, and they start a relationship at the end of the series.
 Lee Si-young as Yoon Hae-ra
 She is considered to be Baek Seung-jo's female equivalent. She is smart, good-looking and good at tennis like Seung-jo. She takes an interest in him at college, but decides to give up on him when Seung-jo and Ha-ni get married. She later shows interest for Kwang Kyung-soo, the tennis club's vice-president.

Supporting characters
Baek and Oh families
 Jung Hye-young as Hwang Geum-hee, Seung-jo's mother
 Oh Kyung-soo as Baek Soo-chang, Seung jo's father
 Choi Won-hong as Baek Eun-jo, Seung-jo's brother
 Kang Nam-gil as Oh Ki-dong, Ha-ni's father

Tennis club
 Choi Sung-kook as Kwang Kyung-soo
 Yoon Bo-hyun as Tennis team captain

Extended cast
 Hong Yoon-hwa as Jung Joo-ri, Ha-ni's best friend.
 Yoon Seung-ah as Dokgo Min-ah, Ha-ni's best friend.
 Choi Sung-joon as Kim Gi-tae.
 Jang Ah-young as Hong Jang-mi.
 Bye Bye Sea as Bong Joon-gu's followers.
 Hwang Hyo-eun as Song Kang-yi, Ha-ni's homeroom teacher.
 Song Yong-shik as Song Ji-oh.
 Moon Hoe-won as Head Teacher Hwang.
 Abigail Alderete as Chris.

Reception

Ratings

Awards and nominations

Soundtrack

Epilogue 
To show Ha-ni and Seung-jo's married life, Playful Kiss: Special Edition was released on YouTube beginning November 2, 2010. The seven 10-minute webisodes were subtitled in English, Japanese, Chinese, and Spanish, among others. The online series was popular, with the first episode initially receiving over 1,000,000 hits in the first two days, and over 19,000,000 hits (and counting) for the entire 7 episodes. Kim Hyun-joong was later interviewed by Anna Coren on CNN's TalkAsia in which he discussed the significance of YouTube in spreading awareness about Korean culture.

Theatrical version
On October 19, 2012 it was announced that the drama would be edited down into a film version. This theatrical edition was released exclusively in Japan on a limited run to selected theaters in Tokyo and Osaka in December 2012. It was screened with the original Korean dialogue with subtitles in Japanese. Afterwards, a DVD of the theatrical edition was also released in Japan.

References

External links
Playful Kiss official MBC website 

Korean-language television shows
MBC TV television dramas
2010 South Korean television series debuts
2010 South Korean television series endings
South Korean television dramas based on manga
South Korean romantic comedy television series
South Korean teen dramas
Itazura na Kiss